Kweku Osei (born 10 June 1997) is a Ghanaian professional footballer who plays as a centre-back for Ghanaian Premier League side Karela United.

Career 
Osei currently plays for Western Region-based club Karela United 2020–21 Ghana Premier League season. On 23 January 2021, he played the full 90 minutes of a goalless draw match against Accra Great Olympics and was awarded the man of the match.

References

External links 

Living people
1997 births
Association football defenders
Ghanaian footballers
Ghana Premier League players
Karela United FC players